Crewe and Nantwich was, from 1974 to 2009, a local government district with borough status  in Cheshire, England. It had a population (2001 census) of 111,007. It contained 69 civil parishes and one unparished area: the town of Crewe. It now forms part of the unitary authority of Cheshire East.

History
The Borough of Crewe and Nantwich was created on 1 April 1974 under the Local Government Act 1972 by the merger of the borough of Crewe (an industrial town), the urban district of Nantwich (a smaller market town), and Nantwich Rural District. The new district was proposed to be called just "Crewe", but the shadow authority elected in 1973 to oversee the transition to the new system successfully petitioned the government to change the name to "Crewe and Nantwich" before the district came into being. The new district was awarded borough status from its creation, allowing the chairman of the council to take the title of mayor.

In 2006 the Department for Communities and Local Government considered reorganising Cheshire's administrative structure as part of the 2009 structural changes to local government in England. The decision to merge the boroughs of Crewe and Nantwich, Congleton and Macclesfield to create a single unitary authority was announced on 25 July 2007, following a consultation period in which a proposal to create a single Cheshire unitary authority was rejected.

The Borough of Crewe and Nantwich was abolished on 1 April 2009, when the new Cheshire East unitary authority was formed.

Civil parishes
The former Crewe Municipal Borough was unparished, but the rest of the Crewe and Nantwich district included the following civil parishes:

Demographics
From the Census 2001:

Average age: 39.1 (England and Wales: 38.6)
Marital status:
Never married: 26% (30.1%)
Married or remarried: 55.2% (50.9%)
Separated: 2.1% (2.4%)
Divorced: 8.2% (8.2%)
Widowed: 8.5% (8.4%).
Ethnicity:
White: 98.0% (90.9%)
Mixed: 0.7% (1.3%)
Asian/Asian British: 0.5% (4.6%)
Black/Black British: 0.4% (2.1%)
Chinese or other: 0.4% (0.9%)
Religion:
Christian: 80.2% (71.8%)
Buddhist: 0.1% (0.3%)
Hindu: 0.1% (1.1%)
Jewish: 0.0% (0.5%)
Muslim: 0.4% (3.0%)
Sikh: 0.0% (0.6%)
Other religion: 0.2% (0.3%)
No religion: 11.9% (14.8%)
No religion stated: 6.9% (7.7%).
Economic activity:
Employed: 62.2% (60.6%)
Unemployed: 2.8% (3.4%)
Economically active full-time student: 2.6% (2.6%)
Retired: 15.0% (13.6%)
Economically inactive student: 3.6% (4.7%)
Looking after home/family: 6.1% (6.5%)
Permanently sick or disabled: 5.1% (5.5%)
Other economically inactive: 2.6% (3.1%).
Crime levels (per 1000 population)
Violence against the person: 5.7 (England and Wales: 11.4).
Sexual offences: 0.2 (0.7).
Robbery: 0.4 (1.8).
Burglary from a dwelling: 7.2 (7.6).
Theft of a motor vehicle: 2.4 (6.4).
Theft from a motor vehicle: 7.8 (11.9).

According to 2003 figures, Crewe had the lowest crime rate and highest detection levels in Cheshire.

Political control
The first elections to the council were held in 1973, initially operating as a shadow authority until the new arrangements came into effect on 1 April 1974. Political control of the council from 1974 until its abolition in 2009 was held by the following parties:

Leadership
The leaders of the council from 1974 were:

On 4 May 2006 a referendum was held to decide whether the "Leader and Cabinet" form of local government would be replaced by an elected mayor. The proposal was rejected by 18,768 (60.8%) votes to 11,808 (38.2%) on a 35.3% turnout.

Twin towns
Crewe and Nantwich is twinned with:

 Mâcon, France

Council elections
1973 Crewe Borough Council election
1976 Crewe and Nantwich Borough Council election
1979 Crewe and Nantwich Borough Council election (New ward boundaries)
1980 Crewe and Nantwich Borough Council election
1982 Crewe and Nantwich Borough Council election
1983 Crewe and Nantwich Borough Council election
1984 Crewe and Nantwich Borough Council election
1986 Crewe and Nantwich Borough Council election
1987 Crewe and Nantwich Borough Council election
1988 Crewe and Nantwich Borough Council election
1990 Crewe and Nantwich Borough Council election
1991 Crewe and Nantwich Borough Council election
1992 Crewe and Nantwich Borough Council election
1994 Crewe and Nantwich Borough Council election
1995 Crewe and Nantwich Borough Council election
1996 Crewe and Nantwich Borough Council election
1998 Crewe and Nantwich Borough Council election
1999 Crewe and Nantwich Borough Council election (New ward boundaries)
2000 Crewe and Nantwich Borough Council election
2002 Crewe and Nantwich Borough Council election
2003 Crewe and Nantwich Borough Council election
2004 Crewe and Nantwich Borough Council election
2006 Crewe and Nantwich Borough Council election
2007 Crewe and Nantwich Borough Council election

By-election results

External links
Crewe and Nantwich Council

References

Districts of England established in 1974
English districts abolished in 2009
Former non-metropolitan districts of Cheshire
Former boroughs in England
Council elections in Cheshire
Crewe
District council elections in England